Yong Wook Jun, also known as Woody Jun, is a Korean international business academic who is the dean of the SolBridge International School of Business.

Early life
Jun received a bachelor's degree in business administration at Seoul National University, a master's degree in management at Northwestern University's Kellogg Graduate School of Management, and a Ph.D. in management at the MIT Sloan School of Management, where he focused on international business studies.

Career
Jun has served as a consultant to major international corporations, including acting as a director of Hyundai Electronics and Hynix Semiconductor, and was a professor of business administration and dean of the Graduate School of Business at Chung-Ang University in Seoul until 2010. In March 2010, Jun became President of the Korean Academic Society of Business Administration (KASBA). Jun also serves as executive director of the Asia Institute.

References

Living people
MIT Sloan School of Management alumni
Academic staff of Chung-Ang University
South Korean economists
Year of birth missing (living people)
Kellogg School of Management alumni